Allahuddins Building is a historic building located in Hyderabad, Telangana, India. It is located at Begumpet.

This building belongs to the family of Ghulam Allauddin. The house of Allauddin and Sons stood as one of the most important house in the commercial world of the Nizam's Dominion. The plan of the building started in 1933 and was completed in 1934, during the reign of Mir Osman Ali Khan. The building has coloured glass facade with intricate metal frames and grills and an external ornate staircase.

It is classified as heritage site by Hyderabad Urban Development Authority, a state-govt. organisation.

External links

Heritage structures in Hyderabad, India
Hyderabad State